Cómplices Al Rescate: Silvana is the first soundtrack for the Mexican television series Cómplices Al Rescate (Friends to the Rescue). It was released in Mexico by Ariola Records, a subsidiary of BMG.

Information 
The CD contains the music from the series performed for the cast, including Belinda, Laura Flores, Fabián Chávez, Johnny Lozada, Silvia Lomelí and the "Cómplices": Alex Speitzer, Ramiro Torres, Vadhir Derbez, Martha Sabrina, Dulce María López and Diego Amozurrutia. The soundtrack was certified platinum.

Track listing

Charts and certifications

Charts

Certifications

Personnel 
 Performers: Belinda, Laura Flores, Fabián Chávez, Johnny Lozada, Silvia Lomelí and the "Cómplices": Alex Speitzer, Ramiro Torres, Vadhir Derbez, Martha Sabrina, Dulce María López and Diego Amozurrutia.
 Metals: Alejandro Carballo and Cindy Shea.
 Battery: Paul González.
 Percussion: Ricardo "Tiki" Pasillas.
 Guitars: George Doering and Pablo Aguirre.
 Keyboards: Pablo Aguirre and Alejandro Carballo.
 Chorus: Francis Benítez, Carlos Murguía and Alejandro Abaroa.

Production 
 Musical Direction: Pablo Aguirre .
 Arrangements: Pablo Aguirre, Christina Abaroa and Alejandro Carballo.
 Programming: Pablo Aguirre and Alejandro Carballo.
 Coordinator Of Production: Christina Abaroa.
 A&R Direction: Guillermo Guitiérrez.
 A&R Coordination: Gabriela Pagaza.

See also 
 Cómplices Al Rescate: Mariana
 Cómplices Al Rescate: El Gran Final

References 

Television soundtracks
2002 soundtrack albums